Mikalai Ivanavich Astapkovich (1954 in Zhodzina, Byelorussian SSR – 2000) was a Belarusian and Soviet sprint canoeist who competed in the late 1970s and early 1980s. He won eight medals at the ICF Canoe Sprint World Championships with three golds (K-2 500 m: 1975 ICF Canoe Sprint World Championships, K-2 10000 m: 1981, K-4 10000 m: 1983), four silvers (K-1 4 x 500 m: 1974, K-2 500 m: 1977, K-2 10000 m: 1979, K-4 1000 m: 1974) and a bronze (K-1 10000 m: 1982).

References

1954 births
2000 deaths
People from Zhodzina
Soviet male canoeists
Belarusian male canoeists
ICF Canoe Sprint World Championships medalists in kayak
Honoured Masters of Sport of the USSR
Date of birth missing
Date of death missing
Sportspeople from Minsk Region